Jaskula is a Polish surname. Notable people with the surname include:

 Henryk Jaskuła (1923–2020), Polish yachtsman
 Zenon Jaskuła (born 1962), Polish racing cyclist

Polish-language surnames